In different sports when a sportsman wins seven crowns, titles, medals, belts or another distinctions is called a Septuple Champion.

Boxing

In boxing, a septuple champion is a boxer who has won world titles in seven different weight classes.

Manny Pacquiao is the first boxer to win world titles in seven different weight divisions. Pacquiao clinched the feat when he defeated Miguel Cotto via TKO in 12th round and won the WBO Welterweight (147 lbs) title on November 14, 2009 at the MGM Grand Garden Arena. Five of his world championships came from the "Big Four" (WBA, WBC, IBF, WBO) sanctioning bodies and two were from The Ring, which hands out an official version of the lineal championship. He also won world championship belt from IBO in Light Welterweight division. The following are the world titles won by Pacquiao (arranged chronologically): WBC Flyweight (112 lbs), IBF Super Bantamweight (122 lbs), The Ring Featherweight (126 lbs), The Ring and WBC Super Featherweight (130 lbs), WBC Lightweight (135 lbs), The Ring and IBO Light Welterweight (140 lbs) and WBO Welterweight (147 lbs).

If minor titles are also counted, the first man to win seven world titles was Héctor Camacho. His first three titles came from the World Boxing Council and the World Boxing Organization; his latter four titles came from the International Boxing Council and the National Boxing Association, a minor sanctioning body that was established in 1984 and not to be confused with the original National Boxing Association that was established in 1921 and changed its name to World Boxing Association in 1962.

See also 
Octuple champion
List of boxing triple champions
List of boxing quadruple champions
List of boxing quintuple champions
List of boxing sextuple champions
List of boxing septuple champions
List of boxing octuple champions
List of The Ring world champions
List of WBC world champions
List of WBA world champions
List of IBF world champions
List of WBO world champions
List of IBO world champions

References

External links
Boxrec.com -title search 
Boxing Records 
Saddoboxing 
Yahoo - Boxing 
IBHOF 
Cyberboxingzone 
True Champions Of Boxing 

Boxing champions